Cornelis de Jode (1568 – 17 October 1600) was a cartographer, engraver and publisher from Antwerp.  He was the son of Gerard de Jode, also a cartographer.  Cornelis studied science at Academy of Douai

When his father died in 1591, Cornelis de Jode took over the work on his father's uncompleted atlas, which he eventually published in 1593 as Speculum Orbis Terrae .
Despite that contemporary scholars consider many of de Jode's maps to be copies of both Portuguese and Spanish cartographers in detail and style of atlas of the time Theatrum Orbis Terrarum by Ortelius, de Jode's atlas never sold well due to his plagiarize.

After his death, the engraving plates were sold to J. B. Vrients (who also owned the Ortelius plates), and the complete work was not published again.

References 

Scientists of the Habsburg Netherlands
Belgian cartographers
Scientists from Antwerp
1568 births
1600 deaths
16th-century Flemish cartographers
Early modern Netherlandish cartography